Protaetia aurichalcea is a species of flower-chafer beetle in the family Scarabaeidae. It is found in Asia.

The ground colour of the beetle is bronze with white markings on the elytra. Males have spines apical elytral angles. Like other flower-beetles, adults visit flowers but they are known to sometimes visit bee hives and feed on pollen collected.

Description
Repetitive mating behavior observed between mating pair. After mating, adult female burrowed down in the soil or organic matter for lay eggs. After 2 to 3 days of copulation, female lays 45 to 50 eggs. Egs are 2.3 mm long and larva hatched after 11 to 26 days. Larva characteristic C shaped with white creamy body and orange setae. Three thoracic leg pairs are weak, so they crawl on its back. Three instar larval stages can be observed. First instar is about 3.0 mm in length. Second instar is 15.00 mm in length and show enlargement of spiracles. Third instar is 25.00 mm in length and bulky in appearance. They feed extensively in first few days, but later become less active closer to pupation. Male larva has a chitinous deposition called "Herold’s organ" between raster pattern on the middle of the proximal third of the last abdominal segment. After 8 to 11 days of larval duration, it builds the cocoon of fecal pellets and soil particles with the help of saliva. Exarate pupa is with transparent earthen cocoon.

This short and broad beetle is lustrous and deep bronze in color. Dorsum and ventrum shiny. There are opaque white markings including a large irregular patch on lateral sides of the pronotum.

Biology
A polyphagous pest, adults are known to form aggregations on many crops such as maize, sorghum particularly from earheads.

A nematode, Teratorhabditis andrassyi has been observed to show ectophoretic association with the beetle.

Gallery

References

Cetoniinae
Beetles described in 1775
Taxa named by Johan Christian Fabricius